"Hughie Graham" or "Hughie Graeme" is Child ballad number 191, Roud 84, existing in several variants. It was collected by Robert Burns. There is a printed version in the Bodleian Library under the title "The Life and Death of Sir Hugh The Grime".
It is dated between 1672 and 1696.  The Burns version was printed by James Johnson (engraver) in the Scots Musical Museum 1803. It is in volume 4 song no 303, pages 312 and 313. 
The Vaughan Williams Memorial Library lists several other versions in printed collections, including "Scottish Ballads" (1829) by Robert Chambers (publisher, born 1802).

Synopsis
Hughie Graham is caught for stealing the bishop's horse, and sentenced to hang. Several pleas to ransom him are unavailing. He sees his mother or father and sends greetings to his father, his sword to Johnnie Armstrong, and a curse to his wife. (The legend is that his motive for the horse-theft was that the bishop had seduced his wife.)

Border reivers were cattle thieves active from the late 13th century to the start of the 17th century on the border between Scotland and England.

Recordings

Ewan MacColl recorded a version on "Chorus From The Gallows" (1960) Topic 12T16 as "Hughie The Graeme"  and on several other albums, including
"Ballads" Topic 2009 TSCD576D 

Dáithí Sproule recorded a version with fiddling master James Kelly and button box master Paddy O'Brien (Offaly) on the Shanachie album Traditional Music of Ireland.

The Scottish folk band Malinky recorded a version of this song, called "Hughie The Graham", on their 2005 album The Unseen Hours.

English folk singer June Tabor recorded a version of this song on An Echo of Hooves in 2003. 

The Czech folk group Asonance recorded a version translated to Czech called "Hugo Graem (Hughie the Graeme)" on Vzdálené ostrovy (Remote Islands) in 2003.

Connie Dover recorded the song as "Hugh the Graeme" on her album The Wishing Well.

Ross Kennedy sang it on the "Various Artists" album "Fyre and Sworde" (1998) Fellside.

Footnotes

External links
Hughie Graham
 Hughie Graham with history

Child Ballads
Border ballads
Northumbrian folklore